New Bus Stand popularly known as Pudhu Bus Stand or Saibaba Colony Bus Terminus or Mettupalayam Road Bus Terminus, is one of the bus terminus of Coimbatore City.

History
The New Bus Stand on Mettupalayam Road, Opposite to CTC Depot, was opened in 2010. This bus stand is intended to act as an originating bus stand for buses plying from Coimbatore to destinations to the north of the city, namely, Ooty, Mettupalayam, Coonoor, Gudalur, etc.

Route

Destinations
Mettupalayam
Coonoor (via Mettupalayam)
Ooty (via Coonoor)
Gudalur (via Ooty)
Kothagiri (via Mettuppalayam)
KSRTC Mangaluru

Connections 
The terminus is connected to all the major places within the city such as:

Town Hall - 4.2 km
Coimbatore Integrated Bus Terminus - 13.6 km 
Gandhipuram Central Bus Terminus - 3.3 km
Singanallur Bus Terminus - 11.4 km
Ukkadam Bus Terminus - 5.0 km
Coimbatore Junction - 3.8 km
Podanur Junction - 9.4 km 
Coimbatore International Airport - 12.4 km.

References

Bus stations in Coimbatore
Transport in Coimbatore